Space Age Batchelor Pad Music (also known as The Groop Played "Space Age Batchelor Pad Music") is an EP (or "mini-LP") by the alternative music band Stereolab, originally released in March 1993. The release became an underground hit, and led to the band securing its first major-label record deal.

The title is spelled Space Age Batchelor Pad Music on the front cover, though not on the back cover or spine; The sleeve and label designs use artwork and text from Vanguard Records' "Stereolab" hi-fi test record after which the group was named, including the "flagbearer on horseback" logo of Vanguard Records itself. The EP title was later used by Bar/None Records for a 1994 compilation of tracks by Mexican lounge music legend Juan García Esquivel.

Track listing

All songs published by Complete Music.

Personnel
Played by
Duncan Brown – Bass (Tracks 6 and 8)
Tim Gane – Guitars, Bass (Tracks 3, 5 and 7), Farfisa (Track 7), Moog, Samples, Radio
Mary Hansen – Second Vocals, Moog (Tracks 6 and 8)
Sean O'Hagan – Farfisa, Chord Organ Moog, Bass (Track 1), Marimbas, Air Freshener Lid, Drum (Track 5)
Andy Ramsay – Persuasive Percussion
Lætitia Sadier – Vocals, Tamboorine

Technical credits
Andy Wilkinson - Engineering
Giles – Engineering Assistant
The Groop and Andy – Producer, Mixing
Magic Glue – Design

References

1993 EPs
Stereolab EPs